Hold the Press is a 1933 American pre-Code crime drama film, directed by Phil Rosen. It stars Tim McCoy, Shirley Grey, and Wheeler Oakman, and was released on October 25, 1933.

Cast list
 Tim McCoy as Tim Collins
 Shirley Grey as Edith White
 Wheeler Oakman as Abbott
 Henry Wadsworth as Frankie White
 Oscar Apfel as Bishop
 Bradley Page as Mike Sereno
 Jack Long as Abbott's secretary
 Samuel S. Hinds as Taylor

References

External links 
 
 
 

Films directed by Phil Rosen
Columbia Pictures films
1933 crime drama films
1933 films
American crime drama films
American black-and-white films
1930s American films
1930s English-language films